Consort Sin may refer to:

Consorts with the surname Sin
Royal Consort Sugui Shin (died 1476), Crown Prince Uigyeong's concubine
Deposed Queen Shin (1476–1537), Yeonsangun of Joseon's wife
Queen Dangyeong (1487–1557), Jungjong of Joseon's wife

Consorts with the title Consort Sin
Royal Consort Shin-Bi ( 1370s), Gongmin of Goryeo's consort